Shampaign is a 2016 Ghanaian TV series written by Shirley Frimpong-Manso and co-produced with ken Attoh. The television series is a political drama that has two season which has thirteen episodes in each season.

Plot
The movie tells a story of a woman called Naana Akua Quansah is a politician and is seeking to become first female president, as she campaigns with her team citizens in the country bought into her ideology letting her have the mass majority of voter on her side. Things unfolded when she had an accident and she fell into coma, the team had to device a new strategy by using her twin sister in her place to win power.

Cast
 Joselyn Dumas as Naana Akua Quansah
 Jot Agyemang as Kofi Malm
 Blossom Chukwujeku as Francis Peters
 Kofi Bucknor as Nene Adodoadji
 Daniel Kojo Delong as Patrick Nunoo
 Jeffery Forson as Obiri
 Zynnell Lydia Zuh as Priscilla Peters
 Anima Misa Amoah as Kate Malm
 Ofie Kodjoe as Mrs. Hyde
 Tinell Dickens as Elizabeth Vanderpuije
 Madelein Abedi-Boafo as Miranda Graves Nunoo
 Akofa Edjeani as Menaye Quansah
 Lyn Ethel Benil  as Julia Hawkins
 John Dumelo as Jonas Vanderpuije
 Mikey Ashkar as Jason Williams
 Kingsley Yamoah as George Sarpong
 Jamillah Sulleyman as Frema
 Agbeki (Bex) Mortty as Duke Ofori
 Fred Kanebi as Donald Arthur
 David Oscar as Dabo
 Godwin Namboh as Christian Commodore
 Shirely Emma Tibilla as Charlotte Malm
 Marian Addo as Ashiokor
 Fred Amugi as Ankrah
 Miriam Ama Saaka as Aku Brown
 Kabuki Akiwumi as Mary-Ann Wilson
 Princess Fathia Nkrumah as Deborah Ceasar
 Augustine Abbey (Idikoko) as Mr. Hawkson

References

2016 Ghanaian television series debuts
Political drama television series